Michael W. Fordyce (December 14, 1944 – January 24, 2011) was an American psychologist and a pioneer researcher in the field of empirical happiness measurement and intervention.  As a forerunner who approached "happiness" as an applied science, he ushered-in the modern academic branch of Positive Psychology

Fordyce contributed a happiness-measurement article to the journal Social Indicators Research, which ranked in the journal's top 2.4% most-cited articles.  He demonstrated that happiness can be statistically measured and willfully increased (i.e. through "volitional" behavior).

Fordyce worked at Edison Community College (Fort Myers, Florida) where he taught a data-driven "happiness training program" for over three decades.

References

External links 
 , Fordyce's original site
 A Program to Increase Happiness: Further Studies USCD.edu
  at Edison Community College
 Online obituary tribute "I never met Dr. Fordyce in person, but his online book...had a tremendous impact on my life"

20th-century American psychologists
Education in Lee County, Florida
1944 births
2011 deaths